The Kerr/CFT correspondence is an extension of the AdS/CFT correspondence or gauge-gravity duality to rotating black holes (which are described by the Kerr metric).

The duality works for black holes whose near-horizon geometry can be expressed as a product of AdS3 and a single compact coordinate. The AdS/CFT duality then maps this to a two-dimensional conformal field theory (the compact coordinate being analogous to the S5 factor in Maldacena's original work), from which the correct Bekenstein entropy can then be deduced.

The original form of the duality applies to black holes with the maximum value of angular momentum, but it has now been speculatively extended to all lesser values.

See also 
AdS black hole

References

External links 
 
 Motl, Luboš (2010). Kerr black hole: the CFT entropy works for all M,J 
 

String theory
Conformal field theory
Black holes
Thermodynamics